Lodheshwar Mahadev Mandir is the temple of Lord Shiva. It is located in village Mahadeva, Ram Nagar tehsil in Barabanki district, Uttar Pradesh,India. The deity of Shivling worshiped in this temple is one of the rarest of the 52 Shivlings found on the Shakti Pithas across India. This ancient temple has been mentioned several times in Mahabharat. Its importance has been mentioned in many Hindu scriptures and holy books. This shakti peetha is considered to be one of the most sacred places on earth.

Location
It is a Shiva temple which is situated at village Mahadeva in tehsil Ram Nagar of district Barabanki on the banks of Ghaghra.

History
There are several instances in Mahabharata where this ancient temple is referred to. Pandav after the Mahabharata had performed the Mahayagya at this place, a well exists even today by the name Pandav-Kup. It is said that the water of the well is having spiritual qualities and those who drink this water get cured of a number of ailments.The Kula-dèvatā of Lodhi Kshatriya Samaj is Lodheshwar Mahadev.

Fair

There are two fairs held at Mahadeva:

 Fair in the Month of March–April : During this fair, held on the occasion of Mahashivratri at Mahadeva millions of devotees throng the place.
 Local Fair : This fair is held in November–December. This is fair for local peoples. A large number of cattle's are sold / bought in this fair.

Procession

Walking pilgrims with Kanwar of district Kanpur, Banda, Jalaun and Hamirpur worship with Ganges water of Lord Shiva at Lodheshwar Mahadeva

References

Barabanki district
Shiva temples in Uttar Pradesh
Hindu temples in Uttar Pradesh